Miloš Jovičić (born 29 January 1995) is a Serbian professional footballer who plays as a centre-back for Grazer AK.

Career
Jovičić is a product of the youth academy of Rapid Wien, and debuted with their reserves in 2012. He left Rapid Wien in 2015, and had stints at semi-pro clubs Ebreichsdorf and Traiskirchen. On 10 July 2018, he transferred to 2. Liga club Wiener Neustadt. He followed that up with a move to Lafnitz in 2019. He then moved to the Austrian Football Bundesliga with SV Ried on 10 July 2021, signing a contract until 2023.

References

External links
 
 OEFB Profile

1995 births
Living people
Serbian footballers
SC Wiener Neustadt players
SV Lafnitz players
SV Ried players
Grazer AK players
Austrian Football Bundesliga players
2. Liga (Austria) players
Austrian Regionalliga players
Association football defenders
Serbian expatriate footballers
Serbian expatriate sportspeople in Austria
Expatriate footballers in Austria